Washington High School is a high school in Washington, Indiana.  Its athletic mascot is "The Hatchets". The School's primary colors are old gold and black. WHS plays in the Pocket Athletic Conference (PAC). WHS is also a 3A School in Athletics.

Notable alumni
Chuck Harmon – first African-American to play for Cincinnati Reds (1954–1956), who was also an All-American basketball player at University of Toledo
Big Dave DeJernett – first African-American to lead an integrated basketball championship team at statewide level or higher; Indiana's first black college basketball star before playing professionally for the Chicago Crusaders and New York Renaissance
Leo Klier – two-time first team All-American basketball player at Notre Dame
Craig Neal – retired NBA player, former head coach of the New Mexico Lobos men's basketball team, top assistant coach of the Nevada Wolf Pack men's basketball team
Luke Zeller – 2005 Indiana Mr. Basketball, 2005 McDonald's All American 3A State finals MVP, played for Notre Dame
Tyler Zeller – 2008 Indiana Mr. Basketball, 2008 McDonald's All American, Indiana's Gatorade Player of the Year, 3A State finals MVP. Played for North Carolina's 2009 NCAA championship team
Cody Zeller – 2011 Indiana Mr. Basketball, 2010 and 2011 3A State Finals MVP. Played for the Indiana Hoosiers and selected fourth overall by the Charlotte Bobcats in the NBA draft

See also
 List of high schools in Indiana

References

External links

School website
State statistical summary

High schools in Southwestern Indiana
Washington, Indiana
Big Eight Conference (IHSAA)
Former Southern Indiana Athletic Conference members
Schools in Daviess County, Indiana
Educational institutions established in 1837
Public high schools in Indiana
1837 establishments in Indiana